Lily's E.P. is the eighth maxi single by Dragon Ash; released in 2000. It is stated on the CD packaging that both "Amploud" and "Shizuka na Hibi no Kaidan o" (静かな日々の階段を) are lead tracks, as opposed to the general trend in the music industry to dedicate singles to one lead or title track.

Track listing
"Amploud" – 4:20
"Shizuka na Hibi no Kaidan o" (静かな日々の階段を) – 4:30
"Shizuka na Hibi no Kaidan o" (静かな日々の階段を; E.P. version) – 4:16
"Amploud" (Modern Beatnik Mix) – 3:34

Charts

Certifications

References

2000 singles
Dragon Ash songs
Victor Entertainment singles